The Christian Advocate was a weekly newspaper published in New York City by the Methodist Episcopal Church. It began publication in 1826 and by the mid-1830s had become the largest circulating weekly in the United States, with more than 30,000 subscribers and an estimated 150,000 readers. After changes of name and a split into two publications, publication ceased in 1975.

Overview
The Methodist Book concern was authorized by the General Conference to publish The Christian Advocate for 147 years.  Its publishing location would change as the Methodist Church expanded westward and the slavery issue divided the church in 1844. After the church united again, what had become a monthly magazine was finally edited in Chicago and printed in Nashville, Tennessee, in 1939.  It was first a weekly broadsheet, and later a monthly magazine for Methodist families. In the intervening years, The Advocate name was part of the name of numerous Methodist journals published by local conferences and jurisdictions of the church.

The last chapter of the Christian Advocate magazine was reported in Time magazine's Religion section (October 11, 1956):

 

In 1959 editors of The New Christian Advocate changed the name back to The Christian Advocate and its format from pocket size to full size, with circulation bi-monthly. In 1973, due to declining circulation, the United Methodist Board of Publishing authorized the replacement of both magazines with a pocket-sized magazine entitled United Methodists Today. A supplement for pastors was published, Today's Ministry. Both magazines ended in 1975.

In popular culture 
The Christian Advocate featured in the third episode of the 2022 HBO series The Gilded Age, as an example of the prejudice black writers faced in the 1880s.

Notable editors and writers
 Nathan Bangs
 James Monroe Buckley
 William Curnow
 John Price Durbin
 Charles Henry Fowler
 George Peck

See also
Southwestern Christian Advocate
Wesleyan Christian Advocate

References

External links
"United Methodist Publishing House". Tennessee Encyclopedia.
"Christian Advocate (Chicago, Ill.)". WorldCat Identities.

Newspapers established in 1826
History of Methodism in the United States
Christian magazines
Defunct newspapers published in New York City
1826 establishments in New York (state)